Pseudohowella intermedia is a species of oceanic basslet known from the deep ocean near to Papua New Guinea and Hawaii. This species is the only known member of its genus.

References

Howellidae
Monotypic fish genera
Fish described in 1976